The Sárvíz is a river in Hungary.

References

External links 

Geography of Fejér County
Geography of Tolna County
Rivers of Hungary